Caspar Vopel (1511–1561) was a German cartographer and instrument maker. Born in Medebach, he studied mathematics and medicine at the University of Cologne in 1526–1529. He taught mathematics at the Gymnasium of Cologne and in the early 1530s established a workshop to produce celestial and terrestrial globes, armillary spheres, sundials, quadrants and astrolabes. An exemplar of Vopel’s 1536 globe is held at Tenri University Library, Nara. In 1545 he began to prepare maps and atlases. His mappemonde of 1545 is titled NOVA ET INTEGRA VNIVERSALISQVE ORBIS TOTIVS IVXTA GERMANVM NEOTERICORVM TRADITIONEM DESCRIPTIO (A New Complete and Universal Description of the Whole World, according to the Modern German Tradition).
Vopel is sometimes credited with the promotion of the ancient asterism Coma Berenices to constellation status.

References

External links

German cartographers
1511 births
1561 deaths
People from Medebach